The 2010 Silver Helmet (SK) is the 2010 version of Silver Helmet organized by the Polish Motor Union (PZM). The Final took place on 12 August in Bydgoszcz.

Semi-final

Gdańsk 
  Gdańsk
 2 July 2010
 Referee: Andrzej Terlecki (Gdynia)
 Beat Time: 62.93 - Artur Mroczka in Heat 2
 Attendance: 200
 Reference: 
Change:
Draw 14. injured Kamil Pulczyński (TOR) → Reserve 17
Draw 18. injured Damian Adamczak (BYD)

Krosno 
  Krosno
 2 July 2010
 Referee: Jerzy Najwer
 Beat Time: 71.0 - Paweł Zmarzlik in Heat 3
 Attendance: 350
 Reference: 
Changes:
Draw 2. Dawid Lampart (RZE) → Reserve 17
Draw 6. Borys Miturski (CZE) → Reserve 19
Draw 8. Kacper Gomólski (GNI) → Szymon Kiełbasa
Draw 13. Tobiasz Musielak (RAW) → Reserve 18

The Final 
  Bydgoszcz
 12 August 2009
 Referee:
 Reference:

See also 
 2010 Individual Speedway Junior Polish Championship

References 

2010
Helmet Silver